Bone Island is a tiny island as part of Batticaloa Lagoon among other small islands of Sri Lanka It has no causeway connection to the mainland, it is connected by boat. It uses as resting place by local fishermen, and it has significant attraction of local tourists. J. A. Bone, Asst. Government Agent (1833–1837), built a small bungalow in the island. Later, the island called by his name.

Picture Gallery

See also 
List of islands of Sri Lanka

References 

The information in this article is based on that in its Tamil equivalent.

Landforms of Batticaloa District
Landforms of Eastern Province, Sri Lanka
Uninhabited islands of Sri Lanka